The 2000–01 Polish Cup was the forty-seventh season of the annual Polish cup competition. It began on 27 June 2000 with the Preliminary Round and ended on 27 May 2001 with second leg of the Final, played at Stadion Polonii, Warsaw. The winners qualified for the qualifying round of the UEFA Cup. Amica Wronki were the defending champions.

Preliminary round 
The matches took place on 27 June and 2 July 2000.

! colspan="3" style="background:cornsilk;"|27 June 2000

|-
! colspan="3" style="background:cornsilk;"|2 July 2000

|}

Round 1 
The matches took place on 9 August 2000.

! colspan="3" style="background:cornsilk;"|9 August 2000

|-
! colspan="3" style="background:cornsilk;"|No match

|}

Notes
Note 1: Polonia Leszno withdrew from the competition.
Note 2: Odra Szczecin withdrew from the competition.
Note 3: Konin Bydgoszcz withdrew from the competition.

Round 2 
The matches took place on 13 September 2000.

! colspan="3" style="background:cornsilk;"|13 September 2000

|}

Round 3 
The matches took place on 23 September 2000.

! colspan="3" style="background:cornsilk;"|23 September 2000

|}

Round 4 
The matches took place on 22 November 2000.

! colspan="3" style="background:cornsilk;"|22 November 2000

|}

Quarter-finals 
The first legs took place on 7 March, when the second legs took place on 14 March 2001.

|}

Semi-finals 
The first legs took place on 11 April, when the second legs took place on 18 April 2001.

|}

Final

First leg

Second leg 

Polonia Warsaw won 4–3 on aggregate

References

External links 
 90minut.pl 

Polish Cup seasons
Polish Cup
Cup